Fox Movies is a television network, launched by the Fox Networks Group, which airs across several countries in Europe. Its basic programming include numerous 20th Century Fox, Disney, Columbia Pictures, Pixar, Marvel Studios, Metro-Goldwyn-Mayer, and DreamWorks.

It was launched in Bulgaria and other Balkan countries in 2012. It is another Hollywood movie channel whose main competitor is HBO Europe.

Programming
The channel airs the most recent and successful movies airing many genres including drama, comedy, science fiction, action and horror. Programming during the summer slate included hits such as X-Men and The Queen.

See also
 Fox Movies (Portugal)
 Fox Movies (Southeast Asia)
 Fox Movies (Japan)
 Fox Movies

References

Fox Networks Group
Television stations in Serbia
Television networks in Bulgaria
Television channels in Slovenia
Television stations in Montenegro
Television channels in North Macedonia
Television channels and stations established in 2012
Movie channels
Balkans